Diego Chávez may refer to:

 Diego Chávez (footballer, born 1993), Peruvian right-back
 Diego Chávez (footballer, born 1995), Mexican midfielder
 Diego Chávez (footballer, born 1997), Argentine midfielder